Qatanqor (also Romanized as Qāṭānqor and Qātānqor) is a village in Behi-e Feyzolah Beygi Rural District, in the Central District of Bukan County, West Azerbaijan Province, Iran. At the 2006 census, its population was 147, in 30 families.

Name 
According to Vladimir Minorsky, the name "Qatanqur" may be derived from the Mongolian word qatanghir, meaning "slender".

References 

Populated places in Bukan County